Sylvester Madut Abraham Ayuel Kiir (born March 2, 1933, in Majak Akoon, Wanyjok, South Sudan), professionally known as Sylvester Madut Abraham, also known as Madut Aluk, is a South Sudanese educationist who taught in many schools in the United Sudan. He served as an educational director-general of the Ministry of Education of Aweil in 2010. He is the father of the youngest South Sudanese singer, Clement Soj. Sylvester attended the graduation ceremony of the Teacher Training Centre on December 6, 2006, which was organized by Ananda Marga Universal Relief Team (AMURT). Sylvester had been working with Ananda Marga Universal Relief Team (AMURT) in Malualkhon, Wanyjok, South Sudan.

Sports

References

Living people
People from Bahr el Ghazal
Dinka people
South Sudanese Protestants
1933 births